Lirio Abbate (born 26 February 1971, in Castelbuono) is an Italian journalist and editor-in-chief of the Italian weekly news magazine L'Espresso. Before joining the magazine, he was a correspondent from Sicily for the news agency ANSA and the national newspaper La Stampa.

He was born in Castelbuono in the province of Palermo, and started his journalistic career in 1990 at the Giornale di Sicilia where he remained until 1997 when he moved to ANSA. In 1998 he also started working for La Stampa. In 2003 he was elected Journalist of the Year by Unione Nazionale Cronisti (Unci). He reported on the Mafia and clandestine immigration on the Sicilian coast. He was the only journalist to be present during the arrest in April 2006 of the "boss of bosses" of Cosa Nostra,  Bernardo Provenzano, who was jailed after 43 years on the run.

Abbate angered the Mafia with a book published in 2007 with colleague Peter Gomez called I Complici ("The Accomplices") about links between politicians and Bernardo Provenzano. When over police wiretaps heard mafiosi were heard discussing how to silence Abbate in revenge for his news reports and book, police decided to give him and his wife a police escort.

On the night of September 2, 2007, his police bodyguards surprised two men placing a home-made bomb under his car. This murder attempt came a few days after he had returned to Palermo and after several months of threats following the publication of his book.

Mafia boss Leoluca Bagarella threatened him publicly during a trial in October 2007. “I have been more worried since this case,” said Abbate. “Bagarella sent a message to his accomplices giving my name in open court. He has been in prison since 1995 and since I work for a news agency, my articles are not by-lined. How did he know that it was me who had written any particular article?”

Despite the threats and police escort Abbate has not left Palermo. "If I left after they put a bomb under my car, I would be setting a bad example to other Sicilians," he said. "This way I am showing that I am not afraid, that the state is protecting me, and that I will carry on."
In 2009, however, Abbate left Palermo to work in Rome.

Bibliography
 Nostra mafia dei monti - dal processo alle cosche delle Madonie al caso Contrada, Spoleto: Dharba Editore 1993
 La storia del giro podistico di Castelbuono - La corsa su strada più antica d'Italia, Palermo: Promos Editore, 1994
 La mafia che ho conosciuto, Edizioni Espero 1996
 I complici. Tutti gli uomini di Bernardo Provenzano da Corleone al Parlamento (with Peter Gomez), Rome: Fazi Editore 2007

References

External links

 Intervista a Lirio Abbate, giornalista antimafia

1971 births
Living people
People from Castelbuono
Italian journalists
Italian male journalists
Antimafia
Historians of the Sicilian Mafia
Writers from the Province of Palermo